Lana in Love is a 1991 film directed by Bashar Shbib.

References

External links 
 
 

1991 films
English-language Canadian films
1991 romantic drama films
Films directed by Bashar Shbib
Canadian romantic drama films
1990s English-language films
1990s Canadian films